is a Japanese writer. She has won the All Yomimono Prize for New Writers, the Shimase Award for Love Stories, and the Naoki Prize. Her work has been adapted for film and television.

Early life 
Sakuragi was born in Kushiro, Hokkaido, Japan in 1965 to parents who owned and ran a local barbershop. After graduating from high school she worked as an official court typist until she got married at the age of 24, then had her first child at age 27 before starting to write in her early 30s.

Career 
She won the 2002 All Yomimono Prize for New Writers for her short story , but her first book, a short story collection titled , did not appear in print until 2007. In 2010 her book  was published by Shinchosha, which also published  the next year.  Loveless won the 19th Shimase Award for Love Stories in 2012 and was nominated for the 146th Naoki Prize, but the prize went to Rin Hamuro. Garasu no ashi was later adapted into a Wowow television drama starring Saki Aibu. In 2012 Sakuragi's short story collection  was published by Shogakukan. Kishūteneki Tāminaru was later adapted into the film Kishūteneki Terminal, which premiered at the 28th Tokyo International Film Festival.

Sakuragi won the 149th Naoki Prize for her 2013 book , a set of stories told in reverse chronological order about a love hotel in her hometown of Kushiro, Hokkaido. In 2016 Sakuragi's novel , about the investigation of an elderly man's death on a Hokkaido beach, was published by Shogakukan and adapted into a TV Asahi television movie starring Ko Shibasaki. Her novel , a partly autobiographical story about a writer and editor, was published by Kadokawa Shoten in 2017.

Personal life 
Sakuragi is a fan of Golden Bomber. She lives with her family in Ebetsu, Hokkaido.

Recognition 
 2002 All Yomimono Prize for New Writers
 2012 19th Shimase Award for Love Stories
 2013 149th Naoki Prize (2013上)

Film and other adaptations 
Kishūteneki Terminal, 2015
Garasu no ashi, Wowow, 2015
Kōri no wadachi, TV Asahi, 2016

Works 
 , Bungeishunjū, 2008, 
 , Shogakukan, 2009, 
 , Kadokawa Shoten, 2009, 
 , Shinchosha, 2010, 
 , Kadokawa Shoten, 2011, 
 , Shinchosha, 2011, 
 , Shogakukan, 2012, 
 , Kadokawa Shoten, 2013, 
 , Shinchosha, 2013, 
 , Futabasha, 2013, 
 , Shūeisha, 2013, 
 , Bungeishunjū, 2014, 
 , Jitsugyō no Nihonsha, 2014, 
 , 2015, Shogakukan, 
 ', 2015, Gentosha, 
 , Shogakukan, 2016, 
 '', Kadokawa Shoten, 2017,

References 

1965 births
Living people
21st-century Japanese novelists
21st-century Japanese women writers
Japanese women novelists
Naoki Prize winners
People from Kushiro, Hokkaido
Writers from Hokkaido